The Lower Guadiana International Bridge is a bridge that crosses the Chança River connecting southern Spain and Portugal.

Since early December 2016 to June 2017 the bridge was closed due to a landslide on the Spanish side of the bridge.

See also
 Guadiana Roman bridge.
 Guadiana International Bridge.
 Our Lady of Help Bridge.

References

International bridges
Road bridges in Spain
Bridges in Andalusia
Portugal–Spain border crossings
Bridges over the Guadiana River